The 1999 Mid Suffolk District Council election took place on 6 May 1999 to elect members of Mid Suffolk District Council in England. This was on the same day as other local elections.

Summary

|}

References

1999 English local elections
May 1999 events in the United Kingdom
1999